Josh Harper (born December 1, 1991) is an American football wide receiver for the Oakland Panthers of the Indoor Football League. He played college football with Fresno State.

Early years
Harper attended St. Mary's High School in Stockton, California, where he played football, basketball and ran track. He played numerous positions including wide receiver, safety, running back, punt returner and kick returner for the St. Mary's Rams football team. He finished his high school career with 164 receptions for 2,669 yards and 28 receiving touchdowns. In track & field, Harper competed as a sprinter, recording personal-best times of 12.04 seconds in the 100-meter dash and 24.22 seconds in the 200-meter dash.

Harper was ranked by Rivals.com as a three-star recruit. He was recruited by Cal, Arizona, Arizona State, Nevada, Oregon, Oregon State, Stanford, UCLA, Washington and Washington State.

College career
Harper was redshirted as a freshman at Fresno State University in 2010. As redshirt freshman in 2011, he played in 11 games with three starts and recorded 35 receptions for 497 yards and five touchdowns. As a sophomore in 2012, Harper played in only five games due to injuries. He finished the season with 24 receptions for 333 yards and four touchdowns. As a junior in 2013, he had 79 receptions for 1,011 yards and 13 touchdowns in 11 games. Harper entered his senior season in 2014 as a starter.

Professional career

Oakland Raiders
After going undrafted in the 2015 NFL Draft, Harper signed with the Oakland Raiders on May 8, 2015. On September 1, 2015, he was waived by the Raiders.

Calgary Stampeders
On June 13, 2016, Harper signed with the Calgary Stampeders. On June 19, 2016, he was released by the Stampeders.

Oakland Panthers
On November 4, 2019, Harper signed with the Oakland Panthers.

Personal life
He is the youngest of nine children born to Willie Harper, who played in the NFL as an outside linebacker.

He is uncle of the rapper Saweetie and first cousin of actor Gabrielle Union.

References

External links
Fresno State Bulldogs bio

1991 births
Living people
Players of American football from San Jose, California
Players of Canadian football from San Jose, California
American football wide receivers
Fresno State Bulldogs football players
Oakland Raiders players
Calgary Stampeders players